Daisuke Miyashiro (born June 7, 1991) is a Japanese professional footballer who played as a midfielder for Brown de Adrogué of the Primera B Nacional in Argentina.

Clubs
 Brown de Adrogué 2009–2013

References
 
 

1991 births
Living people
Japanese footballers
Association football people from Kanagawa Prefecture
Association football midfielders
Club Atlético Brown footballers
Japanese expatriate footballers
Japanese expatriate sportspeople in Argentina
Expatriate footballers in Argentina